Maroc Soir may refer to the following newspaper companies:

 Maroc Soir Group, a Moroccan newspaper publishing company.
 Maroc Soir (newspaper), a Moroccan newspaper owned by Maroc Soir Group.